Rakhshani (also Romanized as Rakhshānī) is a village in Dust Mohammad Rural District, in the Central District of Hirmand County, Sistan and Baluchestan Province, Iran. It lies near the border with Afghanistan. At the 2006 census, its population was 33, in 8 families.

References

Baloch people
Populated places in Hirmand County